Sebastián Lucas Tagliabúe (born 22 February 1985) is a professional footballer who plays for Al-Wahda. Born in Argentina, he represents the United Arab Emirates national team.

Club career
Tagliabúe started his association football career at Primera C side Club Atletico Colegiales from 2003 to 2008. He helped win the Primera C (fourth tier) championship with Colegiales. He was signed abroad by Everton from the Primera División de Chile. Tagliabúe made his debut in a 5–5 draw against Deportes La Serena where he scored a hat-trick. After a spell at Everton where he scored six goals in 13 matches, Tagliabúe moved to Deportes La Serena scoring 13 times in 27 matches. After one year, in 2010, he moved to Once Caldas where he was able to participate in the 2010 Copa Libertadores.

Saudi Arabia
After his spell in Colombia, Tagliabúe moved overseas to Saudi Arabia after being approached by Al-Ittifaq. Tagliabúe scored 21 goals in 44 matches from 2010 to 2012. Al-Shabab signed him in 2012. Tagliabúe scored 19 goals in 25 matches in the 2012–13 Saudi Premier League season.

United Arab Emirates
Tagliabúe was offered to join UAE Pro-League side Al-Wahda and in June 2013 agreed to a five-year contract. He scored a hat-trick on 14 December 2017 in a UAE League Cup match against Al-Wasl. After spending seven years at the club winning at least four domestic titles, Tagliabúe joined Al-Nasr on a two-year contract. And on 13 June 2022, Tagliabúe joined his former club Al-Wahda.

International career
In 2020, Tagliabúe was naturalized as an Emirati citizen making him one of the first three non Emirati-born players to do so alongside Fábio Virginio de Lima and Caio Canedo Corrêa both from Brazil. Following the naturalization, he was called up to the United Arab Emirates team by Jorge Luis Pinto in October 2020 where he made his debut against Uzbekistan and scored his first international goal in a 2–1 defeat.

Career statistics

Club

International 
 Scores and results list the United Arab Emirates's goal tally first, score column indicates score after each Tagliabúe goal.

Honours
Club Atletico Colegiales
 Primera B Metropolitana: 2007–08

Al Wahda
 UAE President's Cup: 2016–17
 UAE League Cup: 2017–18
 UAE Super Cup: 2017, 2018

Individual
 Saudi Professional League top scorer: 2012–13
 UAE Pro-League top scorer: 2015–16, 2018–19

Reference

External link
 BDFA profile
 Sebastián Tagliabúe Interview

1985 births
Living people
Sportspeople from Buenos Aires Province
Emirati footballers
United Arab Emirates international footballers
Argentine footballers
Argentine emigrants to the United Arab Emirates
Naturalized citizens of the United Arab Emirates
Association football forwards
Argentine expatriate footballers
Everton de Viña del Mar footballers
Deportes La Serena footballers
Once Caldas footballers
Ettifaq FC players
Al-Shabab FC (Riyadh) players
Al Wahda FC players
Al-Nasr SC (Dubai) players
Expatriate footballers in Chile
Expatriate footballers in Colombia
Expatriate footballers in Saudi Arabia
Expatriate footballers in the United Arab Emirates
Argentine expatriate sportspeople in Saudi Arabia
Argentine expatriate sportspeople in the United Arab Emirates
Categoría Primera A players
Chilean Primera División players
Saudi Professional League players
UAE Pro League players